Kamakhyanagar is a Vidhan Sabha constituency of Dhenkanal district, Odisha.

Area of this constituency includes Kamakhyanagar, Bhuban, 15 GPs (Badasuanlo, Jagannathpur, Bhairapur, Baruan(K), Baunspal, Kanapura, Baisinga, Baligorad, Mahulapal, Kadua, Rainarasinghpur, Sogar, Budhibilli, Bankual and Kotagara) of Kamakshyanagar block and 7 GPs (Barada, Gengutia, Sankulei, Tarva, Chaulia, Sogarpasi and Bansingh) of Dhenkanal block, and Bhuban block.

In 1985 election, Bharatiya Janata Party candidate Prasanna Pattnaik was elected from Kamakhyanagar to become the first Bharatiya Janata Party (BJP) MLA from Odisha.

In 2009 election, Biju Janata Dal candidate Prafulla Kumar Mallik defeated Indian National Congress candidate Satrughan Jena by a margin of 20,594 votes.

Elected Members

13 elections held during 1961 to 2014. Elected members from the Kamakshyanagar constituency are:
2014: (57): Prafulla Kumar Mallik (BJD)
2009: (57): Prafulla Kumar Mallik (BJD)
2004: (120): Prafulla Kumar Mallik (BJD)
2000: (120): Brahmananda Biswal (BJD)
1995: (120): Kailash Chandra Mohapatra (Congress) 
1990: (120): Prasanna Pattnaik (Janata Dal) 
1985: (120): Prasanna Pattnaik (Bharatiya Janata Party)
1980: (120): Kailash Chandra Mohapatra (Congress-I)
1977: (120): Prasanna Kumar Pattnayak  (Janata Party)
1974: (120): Brahmananda Biswal (Congress)
1971: (134): Brahmananda Biswal (Orissa Jana Congress)
1967: (134): Brundaban Tripathy (Swatantra)
1961: (75): Brundaban Tripathy (Ganatantra Parishad)

2019 Election Result

2014 Election Result
In 2014 election, Biju Janata Dal candidate Prafulla Kumar Mallik defeated Indian National Congress candidate Bhabani Sankar Mohaptra by a margin of 16,881 votes.

Summary of results of the 2009 Election

Notes

References

Assembly constituencies of Odisha
Dhenkanal district